James Ellis (June 1, 1896 – death unknown), nicknamed "Mooney", was an American Negro league first baseman in the 1920s.

A native of Nashville, Tennessee, Ellis played for the Cleveland Tate Stars in 1921 and the Memphis Red Sox in 1923.

References

External links
  and Seamheads

1896 births
Place of death missing
Year of death missing
Cleveland Tate Stars players
Memphis Red Sox players
Baseball first basemen
Baseball players from Nashville, Tennessee